Medicine Hat was a former territorial electoral district in Northwest Territories, Canada. The electoral district was created with the passage of the North-West Representation Act of 1888. The primary population center and the districts name sake was the city of Medicine Hat. The district was abolished in 1905 with the creation of Saskatchewan and Alberta.

Members of the Legislative Assembly (MLAs)

Election results

1888 election

1891 election

1894 election

1898 election

1902 election

References

External links 
Website of the Legislative Assembly of Northwest Territories

Former electoral districts of Northwest Territories
Politics of Medicine Hat